Infest may refer to:

Infest, wild animal overpopulation, much in the same way that cockroaches do 
Infest (album), a 2000 hard rock album by Papa Roach
Infest (band), American hardcore band
Infest (festival), an alternative electronic music festival in Bradford, UK since 1998
In-Fest, an indoor rock music festival based in London, England since 2007

Related terms
Infestation (disambiguation)
Overpopulation (animals)